Anthony Lee Weaver (born July 28, 1980) is an American football coach and former player who is the associate head coach and defensive line coach for the Baltimore Ravens of the National Football League (NFL). He previously coached for the Cleveland Browns, Buffalo Bills, Houston Texans and New York Jets. Weaver was a college football defensive end at Notre Dame and was drafted by the Ravens in the second round of the 2002 NFL Draft. He also previously played for the Texans.

Early years
Weaver attended Saratoga Springs High School in Saratoga Springs, New York.

Playing career

Baltimore Ravens
Weaver was selected by the Baltimore Ravens in the 2nd round (52nd overall) of the 2002 NFL Draft. In four seasons for the Ravens, he started 54 regular season games, as well as one playoff game.

Houston Texans
In March 2006, Weaver signed a free-agent contract with the Houston Texans. He spent three seasons in Houston, where he started 44 games.

NFL statistics

Key
 GP: games played
 COMB: combined tackles
 TOTAL: total tackles
 AST: assisted tackles
 SACK: sacks
 FF: forced fumbles
 FR: fumble recoveries 
 FR YDS: fumble return yards
 INT: interceptions
 IR YDS: interception return yards
 AVG IR: average interception return
 LNG: longest interception return
 TD: interceptions returned for touchdown
 PD: passes defensed

Coaching career

College coaching

Florida
In 2010, Weaver was hired as a defensive graduate assistant at the University of Florida by Urban Meyer.

North Texas
When defensive line coach, Dan McCarney, took the head coaching job at the University of North Texas, Weaver was named interim defensive line coach for the Outback Bowl. Shortly after the bowl game, Weaver reunited with McCarney as the linebackers coach for the Mean Green.

NFL

New York Jets
In February 2012, Weaver was hired by the New York Jets as their assistant defensive line coach under head coach Rex Ryan. Weaver previously played for Ryan for four years as a Raven.

Buffalo Bills
In January 2013, Weaver was hired by the Buffalo Bills as their defensive line coach under head coach Doug Marrone.

Houston Texans
In 2016, Weaver was hired by the Houston Texans as their defensive line coach under head coach Bill O'Brien.

On January 20, 2020, Weaver was promoted to defensive coordinator and defensive line coach.

Baltimore Ravens
On January 22, 2021, Weaver was hired by the Baltimore Ravens as their defensive line coach and run game coordinator.

Personal life
Weaver is of Irish-Samoan descent. He is the son of Ralph and Melania Weaver. Weaver and his wife, Kristin, have 2 sons, Anthony Jr. and Justus Weaver

In 2010, Weaver was inducted into the Saratoga High Blue Streaks Hall of Fame. In 2011, he was inducted into the Capital Region Hall of Fame.

References

External links
  Career stats

1980 births
American football defensive ends
Baltimore Ravens coaches
Baltimore Ravens players
Buffalo Bills coaches
Cleveland Browns coaches
Living people
Houston Texans coaches
Houston Texans players
New York Jets coaches
North Texas Mean Green football coaches
Sportspeople from Saratoga Springs, New York
Sportspeople from Killeen, Texas
National Football League defensive coordinators
Notre Dame Fighting Irish football players
Ed Block Courage Award recipients